The Freedom People's Alliance (abbreviated FPA;  Nidahas Janathā Sandānaya;  Cutantira Makkaḷ Kūṭṭaṇi) is a political alliance in Sri Lanka founded in 2023 to contest in the upcoming local elections. The alliance consists of 12 political parties, including the Sri Lanka Freedom Party (SFLP), the Uttara Lanka Sabhagaya and the Freedom People's Congress.

According to ULS chairman Wimal Weerawansa, the alliance does not have a single leader, but a leadership board.

Background 
On 31 October 2019, seventeen parties including the Sri Lanka Podujana Peramuna (SLPP) and the SLFP signed an agreement at the Sri Lanka Foundation Institute in Colombo to form the Sri Lanka People's Freedom Alliance (SLPFA), a political alliance led by former President Mahinda Rajapaksa. The alliance supported the SLPP candidate, Mahinda Rajapaksa's brother Gotabaya Rajapaksa in the 2019 presidential election. Gotabaya won the election and became President of Sri Lanka, installing Mahinda as Prime Minister. The alliance went on to contest the 2020 Sri Lankan parliamentary elections, winning a landslide victory with 145 seats.

However, between 2021 and 2022 the Rajapaksa government lost much of its popularity. The ongoing economic crisis continued to deteriorate due to mismanagement by the government. By 2021, Sri Lanka's debt-to-GDP ratio had risen to 119%. The government had also become highly nepotistic, with another Rajapaksa brother, Basil, serving as Minister of Finance and several more members of the Rajapaksa family holding prominent positions in the government.

On 5 April 2022, amidst street protests against the Rajapaksa government and a brewing political crisis, the SLPP began losing many of its key allies in the SLPFA, including the SLFP. SLFP leader and former President Maithripala Sirisena pledged that his party would become politically neutral and would contest future elections separately from the SLPP.

History 
On 11 January 2023, the Freedom People's Alliance was ceremoniously launched at the headquarters of the Sri Lanka Freedom Party. At the event, Freedom People's Congress leader Dullas Alahapperuma stated that the group's main objective was to fight political corruption in Sri Lanka and safeguard the rule of law, while conceding that the previous support of FPA constituent parties for the Rajapaksa government had been a "mistake".

Composition 
The alliance currently consists of the following parties:

SLFP chairman Maithripala Sirisena has encouraged other parties to join the alliance.

References

External links

Sri Lanka Freedom Party
Jathika Nidahas Peramuna
Lanka Sama Samaja Party
Communist Party of Sri Lanka
Democratic People's Front
2023 establishments in Sri Lanka
Political parties established in 2023
Political party alliances in Sri Lanka